Frank Anthony Piekarski (August 17, 1879 – August 15, 1951) was an American football player and coach who later served as a judge in Pennsylvania.  He attended the University of Pennsylvania, where he played college football for the  Penn Quakers as a guard from 1901 to 1904.  Piekarski was a third-team selection to the 1903 College Football All-America Team and a consensus first-team pick on the  1904 College Football All-America Team.  He was among the first Polish-Americans to gain recognition in college football.

Following his graduation from Penn, Piekarski served as the head football coach at Washington & Jefferson College from 1905 to 1907, leading the Red and Black to a record of 25–7 in three seasons.  In 1914 he returned to his alma mater, Penn, as an assistant football coach in charge of the linemen under head coach George H. Brooke.

Piekarski was also a lawyer.  In 1933, he became a judge in Allegheny County, Pennsylvania.  Piekarski died in 1951 at Pittsburgh Hospital in Pittsburgh.  In 2005, he was named to the National Polish-American Sports Hall of Fame.

Head coaching record

References

External links
 

1879 births
1951 deaths
American football guards
Penn Quakers football coaches
Penn Quakers football players
Washington & Jefferson Presidents football coaches
All-American college football players
Judges of the Pennsylvania Courts of Common Pleas
Pennsylvania lawyers
People from Nanticoke, Pennsylvania
Coaches of American football from Pennsylvania
Players of American football from Pennsylvania
American politicians of Polish descent